Saša Savić (born 5 February 1984) is a Serbian footballer who currently plays as a defender for ŠK Sásová. He also holds Slovak citizenship.

He previously played with Vojvodina, Kabel, Čukarički and Novi Sad in Serbia, and with ŽP Šport Podbrezová in Slovakia.

References

External links

 Player page FK Dukla profile 
 
 Early career at Srbijafudbal.

1984 births
Living people
Footballers from Novi Sad
Serbian footballers
Slovak footballers
Serbian expatriate footballers
FK Vojvodina players
FK Kabel players
FK Čukarički players
RFK Novi Sad 1921 players
FK Železiarne Podbrezová players
FK Dukla Banská Bystrica players
Slovak Super Liga players
2. Liga (Slovakia) players
3. Liga (Slovakia) players
5. Liga players
Expatriate footballers in Slovakia
Serbian expatriate sportspeople in Slovakia
Naturalized citizens of Slovakia
Association football defenders
Naturalised association football players